Ancretiéville-Saint-Victor is a commune in the Seine-Maritime department in the Normandy region in northern France.

Geography
The A29 autoroute passes through the centre of the commune.

Population

Places of interest
 The church of St. Victor, dating from the nineteenth century.
 The church of St.Pierre, dating from the eleventh century.
 The park and chateau of St. Victor, dating from the eighteenth century.

See also
Communes of the Seine-Maritime department

References

Communes of Seine-Maritime